The 2022 Vrnjačka Banja Open was a professional tennis tournament played on outdoor clay courts. It was the tenth edition of the tournament which was part of the 2022 ITF Women's World Tennis Tour. It took place in Vrnjačka Banja, Serbia between 19 and 25 September 2022.

Champions

Singles

  Aliona Bolsova def.  Nina Potočnik, 7–5, 6–1

Doubles

  Darya Astakhova /  Ekaterina Reyngold def.  Cristina Dinu /  Nika Radišić, 3–6, 6–2, [10–8]

Singles main draw entrants

Seeds

 1 Rankings are as of 12 September 2022.

Other entrants
The following players received wildcards into the singles main draw:
  Lucija Ćirić Bagarić
  Ivana Jorović
  Lola Radivojević
  Mia Ristić

The following player received entry into the singles main draw using a protected ranking:
  Emiliana Arango

The following player received entry into the singles main draw as a special exempt:
  Misaki Matsuda

The following players received entry from the qualifying draw:
  Jessie Aney
  Oana Gavrilă
  Bojana Klincov
  Evialina Laskevich
  Daria Lodikova
  Zeynep Sönmez
  Gergana Topalova
  Radka Zelníčková

The following player received entry as a lucky loser:
  Mila Mašić

References

External links
 2022 Vrnjačka Banja Open at ITFtennis.com

2022 ITF Women's World Tennis Tour
2022 in Serbian sport
September 2022 sports events in Serbia